was a hatamoto, and later a daimyō during mid-Edo period Japan.

Biography
Matsudaira Sukekuni was born as Sano Sukekuni, the second son of the hatamoto Sanō Katsuyori. In 1714, he entered into the administration of the Tokugawa shogunate as a minor hatamoto, and received Lower 5th Court Rank. In 1718, he received the courtesy title of Bungō-no-kami.

On the death of his brother-in-law, Matsudaira Suketoshi, the daimyō of Hamamatsu Domain in Tōtōmi Province in 1773, Sukekuni was adopted into the Honjō branch of the Matsudaira clan and inherited the 70,000 koku domain. In 1729, he was transferred to Yoshida Domain in Mikawa Province. In 1741, he became a Sōshaban (Master of Ceremonies) in the administration of Edo Castle. In 1748, his Court Rank was raised to Lower 4th. In 1749, he was appointed Kyoto Shoshidai, at which time he exchanged Yoshida Domain back for Hamamatsu Domain. The same year, his courtesy title was upgraded to Chamberlain. He died in 1752.

Sukekuni was married to a daughter of Arima Yorimoto, the daimyō of Kurume Domain.

References 
 Papinot, Edmond. (1906) Dictionnaire d'histoire et de géographie du japon. Tokyo: Librarie Sansaisha...Click link for digitized 1906 Nobiliaire du japon (2003)
 The content of much of this article was derived from that of the corresponding article on Japanese Wikipedia.

|-

|-

|-

Fudai daimyo
Hatamoto
Matsudaira clan
Kyoto Shoshidai
1700 births
1752 deaths